Jack de Gier (born 6 August 1968) is a Dutch professional football manager and former player who played as a forward. He is the current manager of FC Den Bosch.

He was nicknamed Il Butre (The Vulture), after legendary Spain striker Emilio Butragueño. ("De Gier" is Dutch for "The Vulture".) De Gier made his professional debut in the 1988–89 season for BVV Den Bosch. He scored the final goal in Ajax's former stadium "De Meer" on 28 April 1996 for Willem II.

Club career
Born in Schijndel, De Gier started his career at BVV Den Bosch, making his debut in August 1988 at the age of 20. A prolific striker, De Gier joined Cambuur Leeuwarden in 1991 and later played for Go Ahead Eagles, Willem II Tilburg, Lierse SK, NEC Nijmegen, Dunfermline Athletic and FC Twente. He retired in the 2002–03 season.

Managerial career
De Gier began his managerial career in professional football on 1 January 2016 as a head coach of Eerste Divisie club Almere City, replacing the dismissed Maarten Stekelenburg. At that point, Almere were bottom of the league alongside RKC Waalwijk. He managed to lead the club from the bottom of the competition to finish in eighth place and win a period title, which allowed the club to participate in the post-season play-offs for promotion to the Eredivisie. However, Willem II proved too strong for Almere City. The club started the 2016–17 season in weak form, but later recovered, partly due to a series of eight wins in a row; a club record. In February 2017, the club extended its expiring contract until the summer of 2018 with an option for another year

On 25 May 2018, NEC Nijmegen announced that they had appointed De Gier as head coach as of 1 July 2018. After a series of poor results, De Gier was fired on 2 April 2019.

De Gier was appointed head coach of Go Ahead Eagles in June 2019.

He was appointed as manager of FC Den Bosch on 1 February 2021.

Personal life
De Gier has his own company and football school in Nijverdal.

References

External links
 Career stats – Voetbal International
  Profile

1968 births
Living people
People from Schijndel
Dutch footballers
Dutch expatriate footballers
Association football forwards
FC Den Bosch players
FC Twente players
Go Ahead Eagles players
Willem II (football club) players
Lierse S.K. players
NEC Nijmegen players
SC Cambuur players
Dunfermline Athletic F.C. players
Eredivisie players
Eerste Divisie players
Belgian Pro League players
Scottish Premier League players
Expatriate footballers in Belgium
Expatriate footballers in Scotland
Dutch expatriate sportspeople in Belgium
Dutch expatriate sportspeople in Scotland
Dutch football managers
Eerste Divisie managers
Almere City FC managers
NEC Nijmegen managers
Go Ahead Eagles managers
FC Den Bosch managers
Footballers from North Brabant